German submarine U-93 was a Type VIIC U-boat of Nazi Germany's Kriegsmarine during World War II. She was laid down on 9 September 1939 at the F. Krupp Germaniawerft in Kiel as yard number 598, launched on 8 June 1940 and commissioned on 30 July 1940 under Kapitänleutnant Claus Korth.

Design
German Type VIIC submarines were preceded by the shorter Type VIIB submarines. U-93 had a displacement of  when at the surface and  while submerged. She had two shafts and two  propellers.

U-93 was fitted with five  torpedo tubes (four fitted at the bow and one at the stern), fourteen torpedoes, one  SK C/35 naval gun, 220 rounds, and a  C/30 anti-aircraft gun. The boat had a complement of between forty-four and sixty.

Service history
The boat's first patrol was preceded by a trip from Kiel to Kristiansand in Norway.

First patrol
She left the Norwegian port on 9 September 1940, heading for St. Nazaire in France which she reached, via the North Sea and the gap between the Faroe and Shetland Islands, on 25 October.

Two crew members died, but there were 73 survivors. She was also attacked three times in one day (17 October), twice by ships and once by an aircraft; no damage was caused. She sank the Dokka south of Iceland on the 17th: The survivors were then questioned by the Germans (a fairly common practice). They said that the sunken ship was the Cukna, but Korth saw through this ruse de guerre.

After that, the boat headed for mid-ocean before docking at her French Atlantic base.

Second, third and fourth patrols
U-93s second voyage was uneventful, but during her third sortie she sank the Dione II with gunfire, northwest of Northern Ireland. She was also attacked by an Armstrong Whitworth Whitley of No. 502 Squadron RAF. The damage was such that the boat required repairs lasting three months.

The submarine's fourth patrol, which commenced on 12 July 1941, was disrupted when three men were wounded in an accident involving a machine gun. Nevertheless, she sank the Elusa on 21 May south southeast of Cape Farewell (Greenland).

Fifth and sixth patrols
Her fifth patrol took her as far south as a point west of Western Sahara. She was unsuccessfully bombed on the return journey west of Cape St. Vincent in Portugal

The boat's sixth patrol was to an area east of Newfoundland and Labrador on the Canadian side of the Atlantic.

Fate
Her seventh and final sortie began with her departure from St. Nazaire on 23 December 1941.

Wolfpacks
U-93 took part in five wolfpacks, namely:
 West (8 – 26 May 1941) 
 Süd (22 July – 5 August 1941) 
 Schlagetot (23 October – 1 November 1941) 
 Raubritter (1 – 8 November 1941) 
 Seydlitz (27 December 1941 – 15 January 1942)

Summary of raiding history

References

Notes

Citations

Bibliography

External links

1940 ships
German Type VIIC submarines
Ships built in Kiel
U-boats commissioned in 1940
U-boats sunk by depth charges
U-boats sunk by British warships
U-boats sunk in 1942
World War II shipwrecks in the Atlantic Ocean
World War II submarines of Germany
Maritime incidents in January 1942